The Hunchback is a 1914 American silent short drama film directed by W. Christy Cabanne and written by Anita Loos. The film stars William Garwood, Frank Turner, Edna Mae Wilson and Lillian Gish.

Cast
 Frank Turner - A Hunchback Peddler
 Lillian Gish - A Young Orphan
 William Garwood - A Young Prospector
 Edna Mae Wilson
 Tom Haverly

External links

1914 drama films
1914 films
Silent American drama films
American silent short films
American black-and-white films
Films directed by Christy Cabanne
Films with screenplays by Anita Loos
1914 short films
1910s American films